Robert Walpole and Charles Townshend, 2nd Viscount Townshend were removed from their positions in the government (the latter having already previously been demoted to Lord Lieutenant of Ireland), and were replaced by James Stanhope, 1st Viscount Stanhope of Mahon and Charles Spencer, 3rd Earl of Sunderland, who cooperatively led the first Stanhope–Sunderland ministry. The two Whigs remained in power from 1717 to 1721, although in 1718, Lord Stanhope exchanged positions with Lord Sunderland to form the second Stanhope–Sunderland ministry. Upon Lord Stanhope's death, Robert Walpole, widely considered the first true Prime Minister of Great Britain, returned to head the government.

The Ministry

British ministries
Government
1717 establishments in Great Britain
1718 disestablishments in Great Britain
1710s in Great Britain
Ministries of George I of Great Britain